Mike Dart is a Native American artist of the Cherokee Nation, who is one of the few Western Cherokee men who specialize in Cherokee basketry.

Background
Dart is a member of the Cherokee Native Arts and Plant Society, Cherokee Artists Association, and Cherokee Arts and Humanities Council.

Basket weaving
Dart is a Cherokee artist, specializing in the art of contemporary double-wall basketry – an exceptionally difficult technique involving the continuous weave of both an interior and exterior wall within each basket.

Mike learned the art of basketry in 1992 from master Cherokee weaver, Shawna Morton-Cain who was designated a Living Treasure of the Cherokee Nation in 2006 for her knowledge and skill in the art of Cherokee basketry.  However he says that his interest in basketry began during childhood when he would watch his grandmother, the late Pauline Dart weave baskets and build woven furniture out of willow, hickory and other materials native to the land around her home.

Mike's baskets are generally classified as "contemporary" because his primary media are contemporary materials such as rattan reed and RIT Fabric and other aniline dyes.  However, he does weave with natural materials such as honeysuckle and buckbrush (Symphoricarpos orbiculatus).  But he says that he will always weave with contemporary materials because it allows him to express himself better artistically, and there are certain colors he likes to use that cannot be obtained from natural materials. He defines the difference between traditional and contemporary as the following: "A Cherokee basket is classified as traditional if it is woven in a traditional way, and all the materials and dyed are natural. A Cherokee basket is classified as contemporary if it is woven in a traditional way using commercially manufactured materials and dyes. Some weavers will use both natural and commercial materials. This is called using 'mixed mediums' and it fits into the contemporary category."

Art career
His baskets have placed in several shows throughout northeastern Oklahoma including the Cherokee National Holiday Art Show in Tahlequah, Oklahoma, Art Under the Oaks Art Show at the Five Tribes Museum in Muskogee, Oklahoma and Trail of Tears Art Show and Sale at the Cherokee Heritage Center in Park Hill, Oklahoma, which is one of the largest Native American art shows in the region.  His art is quickly becoming recognized and appreciated by many collectors and institutions within the Native American art circle.

Mike's work can be viewed regularly in the Cherokee National Museum during various art shows and also in the Cherokee Heritage Center in Park Hill, Oklahoma.

Community work
Dart is notable for his community development work in rural Cherokee communities such as Greasy, Oklahoma. Shawna and Roger Cain and Mike Dart collaborated with this community to recover lost traditions such as basket weaving and preparing traditional foods, as well as reinstating Cherokee gardening and hunting practices.

See also
List of Native American artists
List of Native American artists from Oklahoma
Visual arts by indigenous peoples of the Americas

References

External links

Mike Dart, Cherokee Artist's Association
                   

1977 births
Living people
Cherokee Nation artists
People from Siloam Springs, Arkansas
Cherokee artists
Native American basket weavers
Artists from Oklahoma
People from Adair County, Oklahoma
Artists from Arkansas
21st-century Native Americans
20th-century Native Americans